A cyanotic heart defect is any congenital heart defect (CHD) that occurs due to deoxygenated blood bypassing the lungs and entering the systemic circulation, or a mixture of oxygenated and unoxygenated blood entering the systemic circulation. It is caused by structural defects of the heart such as right-to-left or bidirectional shunting, malposition of the great arteries, or any condition which increases pulmonary vascular resistance.  The result may be the development of collateral circulation.

Types 
 Tetralogy of Fallot (ToF)
 Total anomalous pulmonary venous connection
 Hypoplastic left heart syndrome (HLHS)
 Transposition of the great arteries (d-TGA)
 Truncus arteriosus (Persistent)
 Tricuspid atresia
 Interrupted aortic arch
 Pulmonary atresia (PA)
 Pulmonary stenosis (critical)
 Eisenmenger syndrome (reversal of shunt due to pulmonary hypertension).

Signs and symptoms 
Presentation includes the following:
 Clubbing
 The patient assuming a crouching position
 Cyanosis - bluish face, particularly the lips; and bluish fingers and toes
 Crying
 Crabbiness/irritability
 Tachycardia
 Tachypnea
 A history of inadequate feeding
 Unusually large toe and fingernails
 Delayed development (both biological and physiological)

Diagnosis

Management 
 Morphine during Tet spells to decrease associated infundibular spasm.
 Prophylactic:  Propranolol/Inderall
 Prostaglandin E (to keep the ductus arteriosus patent)
 Prophylactic antibiotic to prevent endocarditis
 Surgery: Variable. Superior Cavopulmonary Bypass (Bidirectional Glenn or Hemi-Fontan Procedure), Total Cavopulmonary Bypass (Fontan Completion Procedure). The purpose of these operations is to redirect the blood flow of the deoxygenated blood to the lungs by attaching the Vena Cava directly to the Pulmonary Artery causing the blood that flows into the lungs to be oxygenated before entering the chambers on the right side of the heart. Mathematical models are used to address the issue of pressure level alterations of circulation after the procedures. The pulmonary pressure resistance in the cavopulmonary connection is increased, and these models permit clear analyses of the pressure increase allowing doctors to avoid possible venous circulation congestion.

See also 
 Acyanotic heart defect

References

External links 

Congenital heart defects